Jefe is the third studio album by French rapper Ninho, released on 3 December 2021 through Warner Music France and Rec. 118.

In promotion of the album, the rapper will kick off a 19-date tour through France, Switzerland and Belgium in 2022, starting in Grenoble on 15 April 2022.

Background and composition
The album is described as a "voyage" through the rapper's success story. In an interview with AFP, he explained that people never really know the former life and the hardships of a man that makes it big. He said that no one ever knows the beginning of the story, comparing it to looking at a completed house while dismissing the fundaments. For the first time, he decided not to include any guest appearances on a studio album. He explained his decision by saying that he could have achieved cross-over success in other countries by including features but eventually decided to take the risk and release a solo album. Prior to its release, it was rumoured that American rapper Cardi B would appear on the album but plans were scrapped due to her pregnancy.

Sonically, the album offers a blend of danceable pop sounds and pure rap songs. Some songs were interpreted as a nod to Raï, a form of Algerian folk music.

Commercial performance
Jefe debuted at number one in France, moving 66,865 total units in its first week, 9,676 of which were physical sales. This marks the second-biggest opening week in France in 2021, only behind Orelsan's Civilisation. Elsewhere, the record reached number 12 in Flanders and number two in Wallonia.

Track listing
All tracks produced by Fabrice Landry.

Charts

Weekly charts

Year-end charts

Certifications

References

2021 albums
French-language albums